The name Laelaps is a name attributed to the following:

 Laelaps (mythology), a Greek mythological dog who never failed to catch what she was hunting  
 Laelaps (mite), a genus of mites which are ectoparasites of rodents
 Laelaps (dinosaur), a dinosaur genus now known as Dryptosaurus